Gary Green (born August 23, 1953 in Tillsonburg, Ontario) is a former head coach of the Washington Capitals and hockey television analyst. He was previously the head coach and GM of the OHA Peterborough Petes (1977–79) and coach of the AHL Hershey Bears (1979–80). He won the OHA Coach of the Year award in 1978-79. When Green replaced Danny Belisle as head coach of the Capitals during the 1979–80 NHL season, he was 26, making him the youngest head coach in NHL history.

After being fired by the Capitals in 1981, Green joined the USA Network as a colour commentator on their NHL telecasts, and remained there until 1985. In 1987, he joined TSN, where he stayed until 2004. With TSN, he covered college hockey, Canada Cup Hockey, TSN Hockey and IIHF events, notably the World Junior Championships and World Championships, and national hockey telecasts on TSN along with Jim Hughson and Paul Romanuk. He also covered the NHL Entry Draft from 1990 to 1998. In 1995, he also worked on a few NHL telecasts for Fox. In addition to national television duties, he acted as a colour commentator for regional TV broadcasts of the Winnipeg Jets (1985–1996) and Montreal Canadiens (1998–2002).

He later coached the Canadian entry at the Spengler Cup tournament in Davos, Switzerland, and provided analysis for the NHL Network and NHL Radio.

Coaching record

External links

 
NHL Network bio

 

Canadian ice hockey coaches
Living people
Washington Capitals coaches
National Hockey League broadcasters
Montreal Canadiens announcers
1953 births
Winnipeg Jets announcers
Canadian television sportscasters
Sportspeople from Tillsonburg
Hershey Bears coaches
St. Louis Blues announcers